Algeria women's national goalball team is the women's national team of Algeria.  Goalball is a team sport designed specifically for athletes with a vision impairment.  The team takes part in international competitions.

Paralympic Games

2016 Rio de Janeiro 

The team competed in the 2016 Summer Paralympics, with competition from Thursday 8 September to finals on Friday 16 September 2016, in the temporary Future Arena, Rio de Janeiro, Brazil.

The Algerian women's team did not show up in time for its matches against the United States or Israel. The team missed connecting flights in Rome after setting out from a training camp in Poland. There were suspicions of a boycott. The International Paralympic Committee's spokesman, Craig Spence, said: "They are still sticking to their story that they suffered the worst transport issues known to man. Whether we believe it is a question mark and we are looking into it." Their first two games were recorded as 10–0 walkover wins for the other team. The team of Algeria arrived in Rio on 11 September. Spence remarked: "Fingers crossed they can manage to travel from the (Athletes') Village to the goalball venue in less than six days."

2020 Tokyo 

Algeria men's and women's team qualified for the Tokyo 2020 Paralympic Games, via 2020 IBSA African Championship held in Port Said, Egypt.

On Wednesday 21 April 2021 the International Blind Sports Federation received a 'notification of a late withdrawal of one of the women's teams from the Tokyo 2020 Paralympic Games'.  Several days later the International Paralympic Committee announced the withdrawal of the women's team from Algeria, and that Egypt received the slot.  No reason behind the team's withdrawal was indicated.

World Championships

2018 Malmö 

The team competed in the 2018 World Championships from 3 to 8 June 2018, at the Baltiska Hallen, Malmö, Sweden.  They placed fifth in Pool D, lost in the quarter-finals to Russia 1:5, and placed seventh in final standings.

2022 Matosinhos 

The team were eligible to compete in the 2022 World Championships, by placing first in the 2021 regional championships.

The team competed in the 2022 World Championships from 7 to 16 December 2022, at the Centro de Desportos e Congressos de Matosinhos, Portugal.  There were sixteen men's and sixteen women's teams.  They placed fifth in Pool A, and tenth in final standings.

IBSA World Games

2003 Quebec City 

The 2003 IBSA World Games were held in Quebec City, Canada with 10 teams competing.  The first stage was pool play with 5 teams per pool and the top two teams in each pool advancing to the next round.

Regional championships 

The team competes in the IBSA Africa goalball region.

2020 Port Said  

The team competed between 2 and 5 March 2020 at the 2020 IBSA Goalball African Championships, at Port Said, Egypt, against Egypt and Morocco.  This regional tournament would have been a regional championships if Ghana and Kenya women's teams had attended as originally indicated.

In the round robin, Algeria beat Morocco by mercy twice, Egypt by 9:2 and by mercy.  In the semi-finals, Algeria beat Morocco 12:7, and mercied Egypt in the finals to take the gold medal.

2021 Cape Coast  

The team competed at the 2021 IBSA Goalball African Championships, from Monday 6 to Friday 10 December 2021, at the University of Cape Coast Sports Complex, Cape Coast, Ghana.  This championships was a qualifier for the 2022 World Championships.  Of the four women's teams (Algeria, Egypt, Ghana, Kenya), Algeria mercied Egypt to take the gold medal.

Competitive history 

The table below contains individual game results for the team in international matches and competitions.

See also 

 Algeria men's national goalball team
 Algeria at the Paralympics

References

National women's goalball teams
Algeria at the Paralympics
Women's national sports teams of Algeria
Goalball in Africa